is a Japanese photographer.

References

Japanese photographers
1939 births
Living people
Recipients of the Medal with Purple Ribbon
Tokyo College of Photography alumni
Date of birth missing (living people)